William Turner Alchin (1790 – 3 February 1865) was an English antiquarian and solicitor.

Life
Alchin  was born at St. Mary-at-Hill, Billingsgate in the City of London. For some years he practised as a solicitor at Winchester. On the retirement of  William Herbert as librarian of the Guildhall Library, London in 1845, Alchin was appointed to the office, which he held until his death, which occurred at Chelsea on 3 February 1865.

Works
During the latter part of his time at Winchester he was engaged in the compilation of indexes to the ecclesiastical registers, etc. of the city and of Salisbury. These indexes have been important to genealogists and antiquaries. He also made indexes to the ancient records of the Corporation of the City of London, and a calendar of the wills enrolled in the Court of Hustings of London.

References

Attribution

Antiquarians from London
English solicitors
People from Billingsgate
1790 births
1865 deaths
19th-century English lawyers